Dennis Darling (born 6 May 1975 in Nassau, Bahamas) is a Bahamian athlete who specializes in the 400 metres.  He is currently track and field Assistant Coach at Texas Christian University.

Darling competed in 400 metres at the 1997 World Championships, where he was knocked out in the heats with 47.96 seconds. By 2003, his best season, he had lowered his personal best by over two seconds and achieved 45.83 seconds. He ran for the Bahamian 4 x 400 metres relay team at the 2003 World Championships, who were promoted from fourth to third place after the USA was stripped of the gold medal because Calvin Harrison was found guilty of a doping violation.

In 2004 he finished fifth in 4 x 400 metres relay at the 2004 World Indoor Championships, together with teammates Chris Brown, Timothy Munnings and Andretti Bain. Darling then ran for the Bahamian 4 x 400 metres relay team in the 2004 Olympics, but only in the qualifying heat.

Darling is married to fellow Bahamian track and field athlete Tonique Williams-Darling.  Darling is the older brother of former NFL wide receiver Devard Darling.  He is also the cousin of Bahamian Olympic triple jumper Frank Rutherford. He also enjoys coaching alongside ASU All-American Jordan Durham.

External links

UTPA bio

1975 births
Living people
Sportspeople from Nassau, Bahamas
Bahamian male sprinters
Athletes (track and field) at the 1996 Summer Olympics
Athletes (track and field) at the 2004 Summer Olympics
Athletes (track and field) at the 1999 Pan American Games
Athletes (track and field) at the 2003 Pan American Games
Olympic athletes of the Bahamas
Houston Cougars men's track and field athletes
University of Houston alumni
Athletes (track and field) at the 2006 Commonwealth Games
Commonwealth Games competitors for the Bahamas
World Athletics Championships medalists
Central American and Caribbean Games medalists in athletics
Central American and Caribbean Games bronze medalists for the Bahamas
Competitors at the 1998 Central American and Caribbean Games
Pan American Games competitors for the Bahamas